was an imperial anthology of Japanese waka poetry. The work was completed somewhere between 1313 and 1314, two or three years after the Retired Emperor Fushimi first ordered it around 1311.

The anthology was compiled by Fujiwara no Tamekane, also known as Kyōgoku no Tamekane, who was descended from Fujiwara no Teika.  This branch of the poet dynasty allied itself with the younger liberal Reizei rather than the older conservative Nijō).

The work consists of twenty volumes containing 2,796 poems. This and the Fūga Wakashū would be the only Imperial anthologies compiled by either the liberal Ryogoku or the liberal Reizei.

Notes

References
 Brower, Robert H. and Earl Miner. (1961). Japanese Court Poetry.  Stanford: Stanford University Press, OCLC 32671

External links
Online manuscript at International Research Center for Japanese Studies: 1 volume (unknown year)

Japanese poetry anthologies
1310s in Japan
14th-century literature